The Baltic Touring Car Championship or BaTCC is a touring car racing series held each year in the Baltic states. The championship is regulated by a board containing two representatives each from the automobile associations of Estonia, Latvia and Lithuania. Eligible cars for the championship have often changed over recent years. In 2022 there are class entries for TCR, GT classes, Touring car classes(up to 1600ccm, up to 2000ccm, up to 3000ccm and up to 4000ccm), V1600 and mono class BMW 325 CUP. BaTCC championship is held together with Baltic Endurance Championship or BEC 6H. Teams participate in 6 hour endurance races in different racing categories. The minor league for BEC 6H is the Nankang Endurance Academy 2 hour race for less powerful cars.

Races are held in race tracks in Baltic States and Finland. Audru ring in Estonia, Bikernieki in Latvia, Nemuno Ziedas in Lithuania and Botniaring in Finland.

The race day format features two races per round, with standing starts BMW 325 CUP and Touring cars and rolling start for GT and TCR cars.

For 2021 season for the first time The Nations Cup and the Team standings were introduced.

Racing classes

The following shows the key specifications issues for each class. BTC and TCR category have two 15-20 min races per event. While BEC Championship has one 6 hour race per event.

BTC
BTC1 cars with engine capacity from up to 1600cm3.

BTC2 cars with engine capacity up to 2000cm3.

BTC3 cars with engine capacity up to 3000cm3.

BTC4 cars with engine capacity up to 4000cm3. Class BTC4 maximum engine capacity is allowed 4000cm3 which includes all the ratios of the Technical Regulations. (Example: 2000cm3 bi-turbo engine has a ratio 1,7 which means actual engine capacity would equal 3400 cm3).

BGT AM or Baltic GT AM class is meant for series production cars with front mounted engines and SRO GT4 cars. Air restrictor for turbo cars.

BGT PRO or Baltic GT PRO class is series production cars and non series production cars (with tubular frame bodywork, or semi-tubular
bodywork, or monocoque bodywork), LM GTE, GT3 cars.

TCR

TCR BaTCC is an official TCR series consisting of four rounds, two races in each round.

Baltic Endurance Championship

A2000 Racing cars with engine capacity up to 2000 cm3

A3000 Racing cars with engine capacity up to 3000 cm3

A3000+ Racing cars with engine capacity over 3000 cm3

GT PRO  – series	production	cars	and	non	series	production cars	(with	tubular	frame	bodywork,	or	
semi-tubular	bodywork,	or monocoque	bodywork),	LM	GTE,	GT3	cars;

GT AM  – series production cars with	front	mounted	engines	and	SRO	GT4	cars;

911  – Porsche GT3 Cup cars;

TCR – TCR	cars.

Calendar 2022
  Biķernieki Complex Sports Base, DeWALT Grand Prix, April 29 - May 1
  Botniaring Racing Circuit, Mekonomen Grand Prix, June 17–19
  Audru Ring, Parnu Summer Race, August 14–16
  Nemuno Žiedas, Kaunas Grand Prix, September 2–3
  Biķernieki Complex Sports Base, Motul Grand Prix, September 23–25

Champions

Circuits used
  Nemuno Žiedas
  Audru Ring
  Biķernieki Complex Sports Base
  Botniaring Racing Circuit

References

External links
Official Webpage
Facebook page

Touring car racing series
Motorsport competitions in Estonia
Motorsport competitions in Latvia
Sports competitions in Lithuania